Jane R. Goodall (born in 1951) is a researcher at the Writing and Society Research Centre of Western Sydney University, Australia.

Born in Yorkshire, England, Goodall studied at London and Oxford Universities.  She is currently Emeritus Professor in the Writing and Society Research Group at University of Western Sydney.

Her research deals with the dynamics of cultural crisis. She is the author of a wide range of books and essays on literary and cultural history. She contributes regularly to the Inside Story newsletter.

Each of Goodall's novels feature the character Detective Briony Williams.

Awards
 Ned Kelly Award for Crime Writing, Best First Novel, 2004: joint winner for The Walker

Bibliography

Novels
The Walker (2004)
The Visitor (2005)
The Calling (2007)

Non-fiction 
 Artaud and the Gnostic Drama (1994), 
 Performance and Evolution in the Age of Darwin: Out of the Natural Order (Routledge, 2002) 
 edited with Christa Knellwolf, the collection: Frankenstein's science: experimentation and discovery in romantic culture, 1780–1830 (Ashgate, 2008), 
 Stage Presence: The Actor as Mesmerist (Routledge, 2008) 
 The Politics of Common Good: Dispossession in Australia (NewSouth, 2019)

References

1951 births
Living people
21st-century Australian novelists
Australian crime writers
Australian women novelists
Ned Kelly Award winners
Academic staff of Western Sydney University
21st-century Australian women writers
Women crime writers